For information on all Arkansas State University sports, see Arkansas State Red Wolves

The Arkansas State Red Wolves baseball team (formerly the Arkansas State Indians) is a varsity intercollegiate athletic team of Arkansas State University in Jonesboro, Arkansas, United States. The team is a member of the Sun Belt Conference, which is part of the National Collegiate Athletic Association's Division I. Arkansas State's first baseball team was fielded in 1925. The team plays its home games at Tomlinson Stadium–Kell Field in Jonesboro, Arkansas. The Red Wolves are coached by Tommy Raffo.

See also
List of NCAA Division I baseball programs

References

External links
 

 
Baseball teams established in 1925
1925 establishments in Arkansas